A trunk prefix is a digit sequence to be dialed before a telephone number to initiate a telephone call for the purpose of selecting an appropriate telecommunications circuit by which the call is to be routed.

Making a domestic (national) telephone call usually requires the dialing of a single or two-digit national trunk prefix preceding any area codes and the destination subscriber number. In most countries, the trunk prefix is 0.

For international telephone calls, the national trunk prefix is not dialed; instead, an international trunk prefix (or "+") is typically required, followed by the destination's country code.

Example 

Assume that a call is to be made to a customer in the Australian Area/State of Queensland with the local number of 3333 3333 and the area code 7.

A caller from outside Australia must dial the international call prefix of the originating country, plus the country calling code (61 in the case of Australia), plus the area code (7 in this case), and then the local subscriber number. Therefore, a caller in the UK must dial 00 61 7 3333 3333, while a caller in the US must dial 011 61 7 3333 3333.

Calling inter-area (within Australia) (e.g. from Western Australia—area code 8), a caller need not dial an international trunk prefix or a country code. However, the caller must at least dial the Australian trunk prefix (0) followed by the area code (7) and then the local subscriber number: 07 3333 3333. Calling from within the Queensland (7) area, a caller need only dial the telephone number: 3333 3333.

However, since the early 21st century, the majority of telephone systems worldwide are able to recognize the area of origin of the call, its direction and destination in order to facilitate communication faster. If the full international number is used, then this full international number may be dialed from nearly any telephone within a recognizable landline or mobile network. This has become particularly vital for users of mobile phones.

When conducting business, e.g., for display on business cards or stationery, the number would be +61 7 3333 3333 instead, and include only the digits that must be dialed from internationally. The plus sign is used to indicate that an international trunk prefix is first dialed and, therefore, a country code then follows. It has become common (but incorrect) practice to write the number with the national trunk prefix in parentheses, for example: +61 (0) 7 3333 3333. However, someone calling this number from the U.S. may mistake the national trunk code for a single-digit area code, as NANP area codes are often written in parentheses, dial all the digits and result in a misdirected or failed call. ITU-T Recommendation E.123 states that parentheses should not be used in the international notation to avoid such confusion.

Countries using national trunk prefixes

Countries that use 0 as their national trunk prefix

Africa 

 Egypt
 Morocco
 Kenya
 South Africa
 Sudan
 Tanzania
 Rwanda
 Nigeria
 Libya

America 

 Argentina
 Brazil
 Paraguay
 Peru
 Venezuela

Asia 

 Afghanistan
 Bangladesh
 Myanmar
 Cambodia
 Indonesia
 Iran
 Israel
 Japan
 Jordan
 North Korea
 South Korea
 Laos
 Malaysia
 Nepal
 Pakistan
 Philippines
 Sri Lanka
 Taiwan
 Thailand
 Vietnam
 United Arab Emirates
 Saudi Arabia

Europe 

 Albania
 Austria
 Belgium
 Bosnia and Herzegovina
 Bulgaria
 Croatia
 Finland
 France
 Georgia
 Germany
 Ireland
 Macedonia
 Moldova
 Montenegro
 The Netherlands
 Romania
 Serbia
 Slovakia
 Slovenia
 Sweden
 Switzerland
 Turkey
 Ukraine
 United Kingdom

Oceania 

 Australia
 New Zealand

Other countries, and their national trunk prefix 

The number next to a country denotes its national trunk prefix.

 Mexico — 01
 North American Numbering Plan — 1
 Azerbaijan — 8
 China — 0 (only for landlines; no trunk prefix for mobiles)
 India — 0 (only for landlines; no trunk prefix for mobiles)
 Kazakhstan — 8
 Mongolia — 01 or 02
 Russia — 8
 Turkmenistan — 8
 Uzbekistan — 8
 Belarus — 8
 Hungary — 06
 Lithuania — 8 (planned to be changed to 0)

Countries that no longer use a national trunk prefix 

 Bolivia
 Chile
 Cyprus
 Czech Republic
 Denmark
 Estonia
 Greece — the prefix 0 was replaced by 2 for landlines and 6 for mobile phone numbers, which are now part of the number
 Italy — the leading 0 is dialed both within and from outside Italy, because 0 is now part of the number and not the trunk code
 Latvia
 Luxembourg
 Malta
 Monaco
 Nepal
 Norway
 Oman
 Poland
 Portugal
 San Marino — the leading 0 is dialed both within and from outside Italy, because 0 is now part of the number and not the trunk code
 Spain
 Uruguay
 Vatican City — the leading 0 is dialed both within and from outside Italy, because 0 is now part of the number and not the trunk code
 Singapore

See also 

 Subscriber trunk dialling

References

External links 

Glossary — World Telephone Numbering Guide.

Telephone numbers